Birchmount Park Collegiate Institute (Birchmount Park CI, BPCI, or Birchmount Park) is a high school in Toronto, Ontario, Canada. It is located in the Birch Cliff neighbourhood of the former suburb of Scarborough.  It operates under the Scarborough Board of Education with the latter board merged into the present Toronto District School Board. The school sits atop on the Scarborough Bluffs overlooking Lake Ontario in what is once the shores of Glacial Lake Iroquois and Birchmount Park itself. The motto is Veritas Omnia Vincit ("Truth conquers all").

History 
To provide additional crowds in the southern Scarborough community, Birchmount Park Collegiate Institute was constructed in May 1963 and accepted by the Scarborough Board of Education in July 1964. The school, as the tenth collegiate, opened its doors on September 8, 1964, with its first principal, John H. Edwards. The structure of the 1900-pupil school were designed by architects Sidney Bregman and George Hamann. Prior to the opening, the students in the area previously attended nearby collegiates such as R.H. King, Midland, and W. A. Porter as well as Malvern in the eastern end of Toronto.

Birchmount Park's Adult Re-Entry program for the Scarborough Board of Education was established in November 1977 with one teacher and fifteen students that evolved into Scarborough Centre for Alternative Studies in September 1986 opened at Tabor Park Vocational School on Midland Avenue.

The school became a movie feature of the 1986 film Youngblood and 2003 film How to Deal as well as the 2004 film Confessions of a Teenage Drama Queen.

The school along with other schools in greater Toronto area started to offer an "anti-black racism course" to combat racism in the communities starting in 2021.

A former teacher at this school (Jonathan Wong) was charged with voyeurism in 2021.

In November of 2022, a 17 year old student was left in critical but stable condition after being stabbed on school premises. This marked the second stabbing to take place at the school in 2022 after a 14 year old student was stabbed in late April.

Overview

Facilities 
Birchmount Park Collegiate is located in a 9.057-acre site. The structure is combined with load-bearing walls and steel-frame construction as well as window area reduced to save costs (although the design bear resemblance to Wexford Collegiate School for the Arts).

The 181,114-square-foot campus has 22 classrooms, lecture room, music room, drama room, six science labs, art room, home economics room, a library, three gymnasia (that can be partitioned into smaller gyms), a weight room, 1045-seated auditorium built in a style of a theatre, cafeteria with kitchen, administrative and guidance offices, and technical shops for electrical, automotive, carpentry and metal. Attached to Birchmount Park is Birchmount Stadium with the 400m race track and sports field with artificial turf.

Athletics 
The school started the Birchmount Exceptional Athlete Program  (BEAP)  in September 1989,  Two classes from the BEAP program were among the 12 courses cancelled at this school in 2019 due to funding cuts.

Notable alumni
 Aaron Brown, Olympic medallist
 Clifton Dawson, professional football player
 Crispin Duenas, Olympian; archer
Brandon Pirri, professional hockey player
 Wayne Simmonds, professional hockey player 
 Devante Smith-Pelly, professional hockey player
 Tim Smith, professional baseball player
 Anthony Stewart, professional hockey player 
 The Weeknd (Abel Tesfaye), Grammy Award-winning musician
 Tyler Toffoli, professional hockey player
 Justyn Warner, Olympian; professional track athlete
 Ian Warner, Olympian
 Russell Williams, serial killer
 Peter Zezel, professional hockey player

See also
List of high schools in Ontario

References

External links 
 Birchmount Park Collegiate Institute
 TDSB Profile

High schools in Toronto
Schools in the TDSB
Education in Scarborough, Toronto
Educational institutions established in 1964
1964 establishments in Ontario